Vladimír Krajňák (24 September 1927 – 15 January 2014) was a Slovak alpine skier. He competed in three events at the 1956 Winter Olympics.

References

1927 births
2014 deaths
Slovak male alpine skiers
Olympic alpine skiers of Czechoslovakia
Alpine skiers at the 1956 Winter Olympics
People from Kežmarok
Sportspeople from the Prešov Region